This is a list of the 2013 RFL Championship season results. The Championship is the second-tier rugby league competition in the United Kingdom. The 2013 season started on 31 January and ends on 29 September with the Grand Final at Leigh Sports Village in Leigh, Greater Manchester, which replaces the previous venue of the Halliwell Jones Stadium in Warrington. 2013 is the first season to consist of a 14-team division, with the league expanding from 10 teams following the promotion of the top 4 teams from the 2012 Championship 1 season, Barrow Raiders, Doncaster, Whitehaven and Workington Town.

The 2013 season consists of two stages. The regular season was played over 26 round-robin fixtures, in which each of the fourteen teams involved in the competition played each other once at home and once away. In the Championship, a win was worth three points in the table, a draw worth two points apiece, and a loss by 12 points or less during the game earned one bonus point. Defeats by more than 12 points yielded no points.

The Championship will be decided through the second stage of the season, the play-offs, which has been re-structured following the expansion. The play-offs now adopts the 8-team play-off, similar to what is used in the  Super League with the top eight teams in the table contest to play in the Grand Final, the winners of which will be crowned champions. A decision whether to use the club-call system, as used in Super League, will be taken during the regular season.

Regular season

Round 1

Round 2

Round 3

Round 4

Round 5

Round 6

Round 7

Round 8

Round 9

Round 10

Round 11

Round 12

Round 13

Round 14

Round 15

Round 16

Round 17

Round 18

Round 19

Round 20

Round 21

Round 22

Round 23

Round 24

Round 25

Round 26

Play-offs
The play-offs will commence following the conclusion of the regular season and includes the top eight sides from the league and uses a top 8 play-off system, similar to Super League and AFL, culminating in the grand final at Leigh Sports Village in Leigh, Greater Manchester, home of Championship sides Leigh Centurions and Swinton Lions. Unlike the Super League playoffs, there is no Club Call in week three.

Week 1

Week 2

Week 3

Week 4

Play-off ladder
Week 1. Qualifying/Elimination play-offs: Fixtures decided by regular reason finishing positions. Higher ranked teams play lower ranked teams. Higher ranked teams receive home ground advantage.
Week 2. Preliminary semi-finals: Fixtures decided by regular season finishing positions. Higher ranked teams play lower ranked teams. Higher ranked teams receive home ground advantage.
Week 3. Qualifying semi-finals: Winners of Qualifying play-offs play winners of Qualifying semi-finals. Higher ranked teams play lower ranked teams. Winners of Qualifying play-offs receive home ground advantage.

Notes
A. Match re-arranged for August due to Leigh's Challenge Cup Quarter Final tie

Notes
A. Matches originally postponed on 24 March due to snow
B. Match postponed on 14 April due to pitch safety issues
C. Match re-arranged from 14 July due to Sheffield's Challenge Cup quarter final tie
D. Matches re-arranged from 21 July due to Northern Rail Cup final

References

External links
Official Website

RFL Championship results